Methyl nitrate is the methyl ester of nitric acid and has the chemical formula CH3NO3. It is a colourless explosive volatile liquid.

Synthesis
It can be produced by the condensation of nitric acid and methanol:
CH3OH + HNO3 → CH3NO3 + H2O

A newer method uses methyl iodide and silver nitrate:

CH3I + AgNO3 → CH3NO3 + AgI

Methyl nitrate can be produced on a laboratory or industrial scale either through the distillation of a mixture of methanol and nitric acid, or by the nitration of methanol by a mixture of sulfuric and nitric acids. The first procedure is not preferred due to the great explosion danger presented by the methyl nitrate vapour. The second procedure is essentially identical to that of making nitroglycerin. However, the process is usually run at a slightly higher temperature and the mixture is stirred mechanically on an industrial scale instead of with compressed air.

Explosive properties
Methyl nitrate is a sensitive explosive. When ignited it burns extremely fiercely with a gray-blue flame. Methyl nitrate is a very strong explosive, like nitroglycerin, ethylene glycol dinitrate, and other nitrate esters. The sensitivity of methyl nitrate to initiation by detonation is among the greatest known, with even a number one blasting cap, the lowest power available, producing a near full detonation of the explosive.

Despite the superior explosive properties of methyl nitrate, it has not received application as an explosive due mostly to its high volatility, which prevents it from being stored or handled safely.

Safety
As well as being an explosive, methyl nitrate is toxic and causes headaches when inhaled.

History 
Methyl nitrate has not received much attention as an explosive, but as a mixture containing 25% methanol it was used as rocket fuel and volumetric explosive under the name Myrol in Nazi Germany during World War II. This mixture would evaporate at a constant rate and so its composition would not change over time. It presents a slight explosive danger (it is somewhat difficult to detonate) and does not detonate easily via shock.

According to A. Stettbacher, the substance was used as a combustible during the Reichstag fire in 1933. Gartz shows in a recent work that only methyl nitrate with its production and explosion potential can represent the famous and mysterious "shooting water" from the German Feuerwerkbuch ("fireworks book") of about 1420 (the oldest technical text in German language, handwritten in Dresden and later printed in Augsburg).

An extract of the text from the 1420 Feuerwerkbuch is as follows (written in Early New High German):

Translated:

Structure 
The structure of methyl nitrate has been studied experimentally in the gas phase (combined gas-electron diffraction and microwave spectroscopy, GED/MW) and in the crystalline state (X-ray diffraction, XRD) (see Table 1).

In the solid state there are weak interactions between the O and N atoms of different molecules (see figure).

References

External links

Alkyl nitrates
Explosive chemicals
Liquid explosives
Methyl esters